Hypertek Digital (formerly known as Hypertek Entertainment; prior to 2006–2013) is a Nigerian based record label founded by recording artist 2Baba. The label currently distributes through Sony Music Publishing, a unit of Sony Music Group. The label currently houses recording music act 2Baba, Victor Uwaifo, and  RockSteady. Artists formerly signed to the label, include Dammy Krane.

History
Hypertek Digital was founded in 2013 by 2Baba, it formerly operates under the name Hypertek Entertainment from 2006 to 2013. The entertainment company, 960 Music Group acquired forty percent of Hypertek Entertainment, alongside Aristokrat Records. In 2013, 2Baba officially signaled the end of Hypertek Entertainment, and launched Hypertek Digital as its new imprint under 960 Music Group.

It was established following 2Baba's departure from Kennis Music, a record label owned by Kehinde Ogungbe, and Dayo Adeneye.

On 15 September 2020, Hypertek Digital signed publishing deal with Sony/ATV Music Publishing. According to 2Baba, the deal, presents top-level expertise, structure and experience to unlock opportunities on a global scale for Hypertek Digital, and it's artists.

Departure

Dammy Krane and credit card fraud
In 2017, Dammy Krane was kicked out of Hypertek Digital by 2Baba, as Ademola Olonilua shares story with The Punch saying, it was for a very wrong reason as he was arrested for credit card fraud and grand theft in the United States. A source very close to the singer, in a chat with Saturday Beats said part of his woes was his expulsion from Hypertek.

Artists

Current acts

Former acts

Discography

References 

Nigerian record labels
Record labels established in 2006
Contemporary R&B record labels
Pop record labels